Cazouls-lès-Béziers  (literally Cazouls near Béziers; Languedocien: Càsols de Besièrs) is a commune in the Hérault department in southern France.

Geography
The town of Cazouls lès Béziers is situated 15 kilometres north of the city of Béziers and is midway between the Mediterranean coast and the Languedoc Natural Park.

Climate
Cazouls-lès-Béziers has a mediterranean climate (Köppen climate classification Csa).

Population

Economy
This is a rapidly growing town with new housing developments (lotissements), industrial zones and supermarkets. The town has good schools for students to the age of 16 years, a large new Gendarmerie and the most modern winery in the region. There is a good selection of supermarkets and other shops. Considerable improvements to roads and pavements make the town easy to explore. The local industry is substantially based on wine with many fine independent vintners and a large cooperative. The community is very active with many clubs and associations for sports and the arts, well supported by the Mairie. Sports facilities include a bouladrome, tennis courts, a 1.5 km exercise track and football and rugby pitches.

Sights

Old town
Centred on the town square with the town hall, a fine church, an ancient clock tower and 2 bars, the buildings are mostly stone-built medieval houses that reflect their agrarian history. A walk through the old town will reveal narrow streets and interesting alleys interspersed with grand Maisons de Maître many sympathetically renovated. A substantial proportion of the older houses are now holiday homes and gîtes and the village centre is far livelier in summer than in winter.

Other sights
There is a well-stocked and informative Tourist Office and the Museum of Vignerons (Le Musee des Emiles) at Domaine Castan is well worth a visit.  Other places of interest include the Roman Baths at Montmajou and the Chapelle de Notre Dame D’Ayde. The area offers attractive walking and cycling for those of an energetic leaning. Of greater importance to the tourist is the location of the town with ease of access to places such as Béziers, Narbonne and Carcassonne, the beaches and fishing villages of the Mediterranean coast and the rivers, gorges and mountains of the Park Natural.

See also
Communes of the Hérault department

References

Gallery

Communes of Hérault